"The Jazz Singer" is a videotaped adaptation, starring Jerry Lewis, of Samson Raphaelson's play of the same title. It was broadcast on October 13, 1959, as the second episode of the American television anthology series Ford Startime on NBC.

Plot
Cantor Rabinowitz (Eduard Franz) is upset that his son Joey (Jerry Lewis) has left home to pursue a career as a singer/comedian after showing no interest in carrying on the family's tradition of being Cantors in the synagogue. After five generations of doing so, it appears that Joey is more interested in making jokes and singing jazz music.

After a few years on his own, Joey, who now calls himself Joey Robbins, gets an opportunity to perform on the television show with Ginny Gibbons (Anna Maria Alberghetti). Unfortunately, his father falls ill during his rehearsal performance, and he runs to his side, putting show business aside for his family obligations.

Cast

Jerry Lewis as Joey Robin/Rabinowitz
Anna Maria Alberghetti as Ginny Gibson
Eduard Franz as Morris Rabinowitz, Joey's cantor father 
Molly Picon as Sarah Rabinowitz, Joey's mother
Alan Reed as Nathan Gittleson
Joey Faye as Tony De Santos
Barry Gordon as Larry
Del Moore as Harry Lee
Robert Hutton as television director
Phil Arnold as Messenger
Sid Cassele as Dr. Miller
Bob Duggan as stage manager
Dorian Grusman as Marilyn
Frances Lax as Ida
Louise Vincent as Rosalie
Oliver Crawford as Moe
Uncredited
Hal Smith as laughing man in nightclub

Production
The Jazz Singer was produced on color videotape and aired as a one-hour episode of the short-lived TV series Lincoln-Mercury Startime (aka Ford Startime). It was preserved on black & white kinescope film. It has never been rebroadcast on NBC.

Eduard Franz, who played the role of the aged and ailing cantor battling his son, had played the same role in the similar theatrical film version of the story starring Danny Thomas that had been released just seven years earlier in 1952.

Home media
The first official home video release, a DVD including both the kinescope and color videotape material from Lewis' personal holdings, was released on February 7, 2012.

References

External links 
 
 The Jazz Singer (1959) on YouTube

1959 television films
1959 films
American musical drama films
1950s musical drama films
Films about Jews and Judaism
Films about music and musicians
American films based on plays
Films set in New York City
Films shot in New York City
1950s English-language films
1950s American films